Peter Kendrew Fox (born 23 March 1949) is a British professional librarian. After eight years service in Cambridge University Library he moved to Dublin as deputy librarian of Trinity College in 1979; in 1984 he became College Librarian and Archivist. He became Librarian of the Cambridge University Library in 1994, a position he held for 15 years until his retirement in 2009.
 He has served on many public bodies concerned with libraries and archives. He was educated at King's College London (BA, 1971); the University of Sheffield (MA, 1973); Selwyn College, Cambridge (MA, 1976) and MA Dublin, 1984. In 2019, he was made an honorary fellow of Trinity College Dublin.

Personal life
He married Isobel McConnell in 1983 and they have two daughters.

Publications
 1973: Reader Instruction Methods in Academic Libraries. Cambridge: University Library
 1983: Third International Conference on Library User Education: proceedings; edited by Peter Fox and Ian Malley. Loughborough: INFUSE
 1986: Treasures of the Library: Trinity College Dublin. Dublin: Royal Irish Academy 
 1998: Cambridge University Library: the Great Collections. Cambridge: Cambridge University Press  (editor)
 2000: "The Librarians of Trinity College", in: Vincent Kinane, Anne Walshe, eds., Essays on the History of Trinity College Library, Dublin. Dublin: Four Courts Press 
 2014: Trinity College Library Dublin: A History. Cambridge: Cambridge University Press

References

1949 births
Living people
Alumni of King's College London
Alumni of the University of Sheffield
Alumni of Selwyn College, Cambridge
British librarians
Fellows of Selwyn College, Cambridge
Honorary Fellows of Trinity College Dublin
Librarians of the Library of Trinity College Dublin
Cambridge University Librarians